Jazz Number II is a 1973 album by Ray Charles. It is a collection of jazz/soul instrumentals featuring Charles on piano backed by his Big Band.

Track listing
 "Our Suite"  (Ray Charles, Roger Neumann) - 8:08
 "A Pair of Threes" (Alf Clausen) - 5:32
 "Morning of Carnival" (Luiz Bonfá, Antônio Maria) - 3:35
 "Going Home" - 4:22
 "Kids Are Pretty People" (Thad Jones) - 5:01
 "Togetherness" (Jimmy Heath) - 4:04
 "Brazilian Skies" (Teddy Edwards) - 5:10

Personnel
Ray Charles and his Orchestra
Alf Clausen, Jimmy Heath, Roger Neumann, Teddy Edwards - arrangements
Technical
David Braithwaite, Ray Charles - engineer
Steve Swain - sleeve concept

References
 Tangerine TRCS 1516
 [ Jazz Number II at Allmusic.com]

External links
 Album summary at warr.org

1973 albums
Ray Charles albums
Albums arranged by Jimmy Heath
Albums arranged by Teddy Edwards
Albums produced by Ray Charles
Jazz albums by American artists